Global Washington is a Seattle-based nonprofit membership association whose mission is to promote international development by coordinating the efforts of other globally-minded philanthropic, research and business organizations in Washington state.

History
Global Washington was founded in December 2008 by the Seattle International Foundation, the University of Washington, and Washington State University. Kristen Dailey, formerly of Initiative for Global Development, became the association's executive director in May 2014.

Organization

Advocacy 
In 2008 the United States Federal Government budgeted about US$30 billion for foreign aid and of that, about 8 billion was for healthcare.  Global Washington criticized this budget for neglecting development.

Global Washington has organized conferences to discuss how United States foreign aid should be distributed. Past conferences that were organized in the past include:

 2019 – Goalmakers
 2018 – Next 10 Global
 2017 – Renewing Global Leadership
 2016 – Allies for Action
 2015 – Disruptive Development
 2014 – Smarter Approaches to a Changing World
 2013 – Catalyzing Collective Impact
 2012 – Redefining Development: From Silos to Collective Impact
 2011 – Opportunities and Obstacles in Turbulent Times
 2010 – Bridges to Breakthroughs: How Partnerships and Innovation are Changing the World
 2009 – A Blueprint for Action

Members 
Global Washington is made up of various member organizations as well as implementing partners. Notable current members include:

Former members include Alaska Airlines, American Cancer Society, American Red Cross, Breakthrough, the Center for Infectious Disease Research, Eastern Washington University, Global Brigades, Global Peace Foundation, Highline College, JPMorgan Chase, Kids In Need of Defense (KIND), Lane Powell PC, Northwest School Seattle, NPH USA, Restless Development, University of Washington Bothell, and World Relief Seattle.

References

External links

2008 establishments in Washington (state)
Non-profit organizations based in Seattle
Organizations established in 2008
Washington State University
University of Washington organizations